Spinoplon is a genus of beetles in the family Cerambycidae, containing the following species:

 Spinoplon bicolor Napp & Martins, 1985
 Spinoplon inusitatum Napp & Martins, 1985
 Spinoplon tutoia Martins, 2006

References

Ibidionini